Drenova is a Serbo-Croatian place name, derived from dren, meaning "dogwoods", literally meaning "place of dogwoods". It may refer to:
 Drenova, Rijeka, suburb of Rijeka, Croatia
 Drenova, Brus, village in Serbia
 Drenova, Čajetina, village in Serbia
 Drenova, Prijepolje, village in Serbia
 Drenova, Gornji Milanovac, village in Serbia
 Velika Drenova, village near Trstenik, Serbia
 Drenova Glavica, village in Bosnia and Herzegovina
 Drenova Lake, near Prnjavor in Bosnia and Herzegovina

See also
 Drenovac (disambiguation)
 Drenovo (disambiguation)

Serbo-Croatian place names